Bermudian Springs High School is a public high school located near the borough of York Springs, Pennsylvania. It is the sole high school operated by the Bermudian Springs School District. The school serves students from most of northeastern Adams County, including the townships of Reading, Latimore, part of Hamilton, and Huntington, as well as the Boroughs of East Berlin and York Springs. 

As of the 2020-21 school year, enrollment was 619 pupils in 9th through 12th grades. The school employed 41.91 teachers on a full-time employment basis, yielding a student/faculty ratio of 14.77, according to National Center for Education Statistics data.

Extracurriculars
Bermudian Springs School District offers a wide variety of clubs and activities, and an extensive sports program.

Sports
Bermudian Springs High School is a league member of the York Adams Interscholastic Athletic Association, and is located in PIAA District III.

The district offers an extensive sports program, including, as of the 2016–17 school year:

Boys
 Baseball - AAAA
 Basketball- AAAA
 Cross country - AA
 Football - AAA
 Golf - AA
 Soccer - AA
 Tennis - AA
 Track and field - AA
 Wrestling	 - AA

Girls
 Basketball - AAAA
 Cheer - AAAAAA
 Cross country - AA
 Field hockey - A
 Golf - AA
 Soccer - AA
 Softball - AAAA
 Tennis - AA
 Track and field - AA
 Volleyball - AA

References

External links
Official website

Adams County, Pennsylvania
Public high schools in Pennsylvania
Schools in Adams County, Pennsylvania